Gurney's pitta (Hydrornis gurneyi) is a medium-sized passerine bird. It breeds in the Malay Peninsula, with populations mainly in Myanmar. The common name and Latin binomial commemorate the British banker and amateur ornithologist John Henry Gurney (1819-1890). Its diet consists of slugs, insects, and earthworms.

Taxonomy
Gurney's pitta was described by the amateur ornithologist Allan Octavian Hume in 1875 and given the binomial name Pitta gurneyi. The species was moved to the resurrected genus Hydrornis based on the results of a molecular phylogenetic study published in 2006. The genus Hydrornis had been introduced by the English zoologist Edward Blyth in 1843.  The specific epithet was chosen to honour the amateur ornithologist John Henry Gurney (1819-1890).

Description
The male has a blue crown and black-and-yellow underparts; the rest of the head is black, and it has warm brown upperparts. The female has a brown crown and buffy-whitish underparts.

Status and conservation
Gurney's pitta is endangered. It was initially thought to be extinct for some time after 1952, but was rediscovered in 1986. Its rarity has been caused by the clearance of natural forest in southern Burma and peninsular Thailand.

Its population was estimated at a mere nine pairs in 1997, then believed one of the rarest bird species on earth. A search for it in Burma in 2003 was successful and discovered that the species persisted at four sites with a maximum of 10-12 pairs at one location. This granted the species a reassessment from the IUCN, going from critically endangered to endangered. Later on, further research completed in Burma by 2009 provides strong evidence that its global population is much greater than previously estimated, owing to the discovery of several new territories in this country

The pitta was voted the "most wanted bird in Thailand" by bird watchers visiting that country.

References

External links

BirdLife Species Factsheet
Image at ADW

Gurney's pitta
Birds of Myanmar
Birds of the Malay Peninsula
Gurney's pitta